Thiago Fernandes Rodrigues (born 13 March 2001), sometimes known as just Thiago or Thiaguinho, is a Brazilian footballer who currently plays as a forward for Centro Sportivo Alagoano, on loan from Flamengo.

Career

Early career
Born in the Pina neighborhood of southern Recife, Thiago Fernandes was rejected from trials with Sport Recife and Palmeiras before being signed by Náutico of Recife.

Náutico
Thiago Fernandes made his professional debut for Náutico on 15 January 2019, playing the full 90 minutes in a 3–1 loss to Fortaleza in a Copa do Nordeste match.  On 16 February he scored his first goal for Náutico in a 4–2 win over Flamengo de Arcoverde in a Campeonato Pernambucano match.  2019 saw Thiago emerge as a starter for Náutico at the age of 18, primarily playing as a right-winger.  He finished the 2019 Campeonato Brasileiro Série C season as Náutico's second-leading goal scorer with 5 goals in 17 appearances. Thiago helped Náutico finish as Série C champions and earned promotion to Série B. Náutico also finished runners-up in the 2019 Campeonato Pernambucano (where Thiago earned recognition as the league "Revelação," or "Best Newcomer") and reached the semi-finals of the Copa do Nordeste.

Flamengo
On 12 December 2019, Náutico announced Thiago Fernandes' transfer to Série A club Flamengo for an undisclosed fee.  Náutico maintained an 18% sell-on fee.

Náutico (loan)
On 7 May 2020, after playing for the Flamengo under-20 team and failing to make a first team appearance, Flamengo loaned Thiago Fernandes back to Náutico for the remainder of the season to get first team minutes.  On 19 July, in his first game back for Náutico, Thiago scored in a 2–1 win over Salgueiro in a Campeonato Pernambucano match.  He did not replicate his form from his previous stint with Náutico, scoring once and recording one assist in 15 appearances across all competitions.  On 5 November, Flamengo and Náutico agreed to end the loan early, with Thiago returning to the Flamengo U-20s for the remainder of 2020.

On 2 March 2021 Thiago made his debut for the Flamengo first team in a Campeonato Carioca match, a 1–0 win over Nova Iguaçu.  He made his Série A debut on 6 December, coming off the bench in a 1–0 loss to Santos.  Thiago ended the season with 7 first team appearances, 2 in Série A, where Flamengo finished in 2nd place, and 5 in the Campeonato Carioca, helping Flamengo win the state league title.  He primarily played with the under-20 team throughout the season.

During the 2022 season, he played twice in the Campeonato Carioca before being loaned to Houston.

Houston Dynamo (loan)
On 21 March 2022, Thiago Fernandes was loaned to Major League Soccer club Houston Dynamo for the remainder of the 2022 season as a U-22 Initiative signing, with Houston having an option to make the deal permanent.  On 19 April he made his Dynamo, getting the start in a 2–1 win over Rio Grande Valley FC in a U.S. Open Cup match.  He made his MLS debut on 30 April, coming off the bench in a 2–1 loss to Austin FC.  Thiago ended the season with a total of 19 minutes across 3 regular season appearances, plus 2 starts in the Open Cup, as the Dynamo finished 13th in the Western Conference, failing to qualify for the playoffs.  He also made 6 appearances with Houston Dynamo 2 in MLS Next Pro.

CSA (loan) 
On 6 February 2023, Thiago Fernandes was loaned to Série C side Centro Sportivo Alagoano. Thiaguinho made his debut for CSA on 11 February, coming off the bench in a 1–0 win over Cruzeiro de Arapiraca in a Campeonato Alagoano.

Career statistics

Club

Notes

Honours

Club
Náutico
Campeonato Brasileiro Série C: 2019

Flamengo
Campeonato Carioca: 2021

Individual
Campeonato Pernambucano Best Newcomer: 2019

References

External links

2001 births
Living people
Brazilian footballers
Brazilian expatriate footballers
Brazil youth international footballers
Association football midfielders
Sportspeople from Recife
Campeonato Brasileiro Série B players
Campeonato Brasileiro Série C players
Clube Náutico Capibaribe players
CR Flamengo footballers
Houston Dynamo FC players
MLS Next Pro players
Major League Soccer players
Brazilian expatriate sportspeople in the United States
Expatriate soccer players in the United States